Mateusz Grabis (born 24 August 1994) is a Polish professional racing cyclist, who currently rides for UCI Continental team .

Major results
2015
 2nd Road race, National Under-23 Road Championships
2016
 4th Puchar Uzdrowisk Karpackich
 9th Coppa dei Laghi-Trofeo Almar
 9th GP Czech Republic, Visegrad 4 Bicycle Race
2017
 9th GP Slovakia, Visegrad 4 Bicycle Race
2018
 1st Memorial Henryka Łasaka
 3rd Overall Tour of Romania
 3rd Puchar Uzdrowisk Karpackich
2019
 2nd Korona Kocich Gor
 8th Overall Tour of Malopolska
2021
 2nd Memorial Henryka Łasaka

References

External links

1994 births
Living people
Polish male cyclists
People from Będzin